A referendum on militarisation and peace was held in East Germany on 5 June 1951. Voters were asked "Are you against the remilitarisation of Germany and for the conclusion of a peace treaty with Germany in the year 1951?". It was approved by 95.98% of voters.

Results

References

Referendums in East Germany
East Germany
1951 in East Germany
June 1951 events in Europe